Zelina is a village in the municipalities of Osmaci (Republika Srpska) and Kalesija, Bosnia and Herzegovina.

Demographics 
According to the 2013 census, its population was 251, with 148 of them living in the Osmaci part and 103 in the Kalesija part.

References

Populated places in Kalesija
Populated places in Osmaci